Carex dipsacea, the teasel sedge, is a species of flowering plant in the family Cyperaceae, native to New Zealand. Preferring poorly drained soils, it is planted as an ornamental for its colorful autumn foliage. There is a cultivar, 'Dark Horse', which is commercially available.

References

dipsacea
Ornamental plants
Endemic flora of New Zealand
Flora of the North Island
Flora of the South Island
Plants described in 1877